The crime of apartheid is defined by the 2002 Rome Statute of the International Criminal Court as inhumane acts of a character similar to other crimes against humanity "committed in the context of an institutionalized regime of systematic oppression and domination by one racial group over any other racial group or groups and committed with the intention of maintaining that regime".

On 30 November 1973, the United Nations General Assembly opened for signature and ratification The International Convention on the Suppression and Punishment of the Crime of Apartheid. It defined the crime of apartheid as "inhuman acts committed for the purpose of establishing and maintaining domination by one racial group of persons over any other racial group of persons and systematically oppressing them".

According to Human Rights Watch and legal scholar Miles Jackson, apartheid is also prohibited in customary international law although there is still debate as to whether it is criminalized as well.

History

The term apartheid, from Afrikaans for 'apartness', was the official name of the South African system of racial segregation which existed after 1948. Complaints about the system were brought to the United Nations as early as 12 July 1948 when Padmanabha Pillai, the representative of India to the United Nations, circulated a letter to the secretary-general expressing his concerns over treatment of ethnic Indians within the Union of South Africa. As it became more widely known, South African apartheid was condemned internationally as unjust and racist and many decided that a formal legal framework was needed in order to apply international pressure on the South African government.

In 1971, the Soviet Union and Guinea together submitted early drafts of a convention to deal with the suppression and punishment of apartheid. In 1973, the General Assembly of the United Nations agreed on the text of the International Convention on the Suppression and Punishment of the Crime of Apartheid (ICSPCA). The convention has 31 signatories and 107 parties.
The convention came into force in 1976 after 20 countries had ratified it. They were: Benin, Bulgaria, Chad, Czechoslovakia, Ecuador, the German Democratic Republic (East Germany), Guinea, Hungary, Iraq, Mongolia, Poland, Qatar, Somalia, Syria, the USSR, the United Arab Emirates, Tanzania, and Yugoslavia.

"As such, apartheid was declared to be a crime against humanity, with a scope that went far beyond South Africa. While the crime of apartheid is most often associated with the racist policies of South Africa after 1948, the term more generally refers to racially based policies in any state."

Seventy-six other countries subsequently signed on, but a number of nations, including Western democracies, have neither signed nor ratified the ICSPCA, including Canada, France, Germany, Israel, Italy, the Netherlands, the United Kingdom, Australia, New Zealand and the United States.  In explanation of the US vote against the convention, Ambassador Clarence Clyde Ferguson Jr. said: "[W]e cannot... accept that apartheid can in this manner be made a crime against humanity. Crimes against humanity are so grave in nature that they must be meticulously elaborated and strictly construed under existing international law..."

In 1977, Addition Protocol 1 to the Geneva Conventions designated apartheid as a grave breach of the protocol and a war crime. There are 169 parties to the protocol.

The International Criminal Court provides for individual criminal responsibility for crimes against humanity, including the crime of apartheid.

The ICC came into being on 1 July 2002, and can only prosecute crimes committed on or after that date.  The court can generally only exercise jurisdiction in cases where the accused is a national of a state party, the alleged crime took place on the territory of a state party, or a situation is referred to the court by the United Nations Security Council. The ICC exercises complimentary jurisdiction. Many of the member states have provided their own national courts with universal jurisdiction over the same offenses and do not recognize any statute of limitations for crimes against humanity. As of July 2008, 106 countries are states parties (with Suriname and Cook Islands set to join in October 2008), and a further 40 countries have signed but not yet ratified the treaty.  However, many of the world's most populous nations, including China, India, the United States, Indonesia, and Pakistan are not parties to the court and therefore are not subject to its jurisdiction, except by security council referral.

ICSPCA definition of the crime of apartheid

Article II of the ICSPCA defines the crime of apartheid as:

UN definition of racial discrimination

According to the United Nations Convention on the Elimination of All Forms of Racial Discrimination (ICERD),

This definition does not make any difference between discrimination based on ethnicity and race, in part because the distinction between the two remains debatable among anthropologists. Similarly, in British law the phrase racial group means "any group of people who are defined by reference to their race, colour, nationality (including citizenship) or ethnic or national origin".

ICC definition of the crime of apartheid

Article 7 of the Rome Statute of the International Criminal Court defines crimes against humanity as:
Article 7
Crimes against humanity
Later in Article 7, the crime of apartheid is defined as:
The 'crime of apartheid' means inhumane acts of a character similar to those referred to in paragraph 1, committed in the context of an institutionalised regime of systematic oppression and domination by one racial group over any other racial group or groups and committed with the intention of maintaining that regime.

References

Further reading

External links

 Human Sciences Research Council: Occupation, Colonialism, Apartheid? A re-assessment of Israel’s practices in the occupied Palestinian territories under international law. Cape Town 2009
 Richard Falk:Report of the Special Rapporteur on the situation of human rights in the Palestinian territories occupied since 1967, Report to the UN General Assembly, 30.August 2010, sec. 5
 Human Rights Watch Report: Separate and Unequal. Israel’s Discriminatory Treatment of Palestinians in the Occupied Palestinian Territories, December 19, 2010

Racial segregation
Apart
International opposition to apartheid in South Africa
Apart
Apartheid
Rule by a subset of population